1945 Országos Bajnokság I (men's water polo) was the 39th water polo championship in Hungary. There were eight teams who played one-round match for the title.

Final list 

* M: Matches W: Win D: Drawn L: Lost G+: Goals earned G-: Goals got P: Point

2. Class 
1. NSC 14, 2. Tipográfia 11, 3. KaSE 10, 4. MTE 8, 5. Postás 6 point.

Sources 
Gyarmati Dezső: Aranykor (Hérodotosz Könyvkiadó és Értékesítő Bt., Budapest, 2002.)

1945 in water polo
1945 in Hungarian sport
Seasons in Hungarian water polo competitions